Blyth Spur is a high spur trending east-southeast from Dobson Dome in James Ross Island. Following geological work by the British Antarctic Survey, 1985–86, it was named by the UK Antarctic Place-Names Committee after John Blyth, cook on Operation Tabarin at Port Lockroy, 1943–44, and Hope Bay, 1944–45.

References
 

Ridges of Graham Land
Landforms of James Ross Island